Herbert Ernest Cushman (1865-1944) A.M., Ph.D., was a professor of philosophy at Tufts College who wrote A Beginner's History of Philosophy and translated Wilhelm Windelband's History Of Ancient Philosophy into English. One may find published lectures of his given at Tufts, such as What is Christianity?

1865 births
1944 deaths
American philosophers